Wicked Little High (2006 EMI Records) is the third studio album by the artist, actor and screenwriter Bird York (real name: Kathleen York).

The album consists of 12 songs, written by York and:
Michael Becker (Tracks 1,3,4,5 & 7)
Rik Musallam (Track 2)
Peter Fox (Track 6)
Larry Klein (Tracks 9 & 11)

York achieved global recognition with her song, "In the Deep", which was written for the 2004 film Crash. "In the Deep" debuted at #64 on the Billboard chart and was nominated for an Academy Award for Best Song. York performed the song live at the 78th Academy Awards in 2006.

"Have No Fear" was the main theme song in the 2008 film Seven Pounds.

Track listing
 Come Be With Me (3:48)
 Had A Dream (5:12)
 Haunting You (4:25)
 Have No Fear (2:25)
 In The Deep (3:34)
 Lovely Thing (3:59)
 Never Gonna Find Us (3:15)
 Open Wider (4:49)
 Remedy (4:44)
 Save Me (4:32)
 Up In Flames (4:15)
 Wicked Little High (4:33)

Kathleen York albums
2006 albums